The Orlovskoye Polesye national park is a protected area in Russia.

It is situated in the middle of the Central Russian Upland straddling the Znamensky and Khotynetsky (two natural climate zones) districts of Oryol Oblast, of area 77,745 ha. It was established by a decree of the Russian Government no.6 of January 9, 1994. This park is a home to European bisons.

References

National parks of Russia
Geography of Oryol Oblast
Tourist attractions in Oryol Oblast
Central European mixed forests